Tudor Mendel-Idowu (born 15 January 2005) is an English footballer who plays as a midfielder for  club Chelsea.

Early life
Born in Berkshire, England, Mendel-Idowu was regarded as a child prodigy academically, featuring numerous times in national and international competitions, most notably coming second in the 2014 edition of Child Genius. At the age of thirteen, he was selected in the King's Scholar programme at Eton College.
He became a King’s Scholar at Eton and is currently studying Maths, Latin and Divinity and more.

He joined the youth academy of Chelsea at under-8 level, following interest from numerous other clubs including Arsenal and Tottenham. In July 2021, he signed a new contract with the Blues.

International career
Eligible to represent both England and Nigeria at international level, Mendel-Idowu was first called up to the England national under-15 football team in 2019.
Tudor scored his first England U17 goal against Scotland on the 8th of February in a 3-0 win and followed that up with a further 2 goals in England U17's next game playing as a right winger. He later made substitute appearances against France and Luxembourg in the England U17 qualification games.

Personal life
Mendel-Idowu's grandfather on his mothers side is, John Adeleye-Abai, played for the Nigeria national football team as a winger.
His other grandfather on his fathers side, Dr Fola Kayode Mendel-Idowu, was a gifted academic - he specialised in bio-aeronautics and was Africa's first 'flying doctor'.

References

External links
 

2005 births
Living people
English people of Nigerian descent
English footballers
England youth international footballers
People educated at Eton College
Eton King's Scholars
Association football midfielders
Chelsea F.C. players